Kacar may refer to:

 Kačar, Serbian surname
 Kaçar, Turkish surname
 Kacar, Kovancılar